Marquel is a given name. Notable people with the given name include:

Marquel Blackwell (born 1979), American football player
Marquel Fleetwood (born 1970), American football player
Marquel Lee (born 1995), American football player
Marquel Waldron (born 1988), Bermudian footballer